Brzozowa Gać is a village in the administrative district of Gmina Kurów, within Puławy County, Lublin Voivodeship, in eastern Poland.

The village has a population of 580.

References

Villages in Puławy County